Grizzy may refer to as:

Grizzy and the Lemmings, a French CGI animated series which began in 2016
Grizzy (Grouch), a Sesame Street character appearing in The Adventures of Elmo in Grouchland
Grizel Cochrane (17th century), a legendary Scottish folk hero

See also
 Grizzly (disambiguation)